Caloptilia gladiatrix is a moth of the family Gracillariidae. It is known from China (Shanghai).

References

gladiatrix
Moths of Asia
Moths described in 1922